DESMO-J is a discrete event simulation library developed in Java.

Overview

DESMO-J is an acronym for Discrete-Event Simulation Modelling in Java. DESMO-J allows for rapidly and flexibly building discrete event simulation models in Java, supporting both the event-oriented and process-oriented world view. DESMO-J provides a comprehensive set of readily usable Java classes for stochastic distributions, static model components (like queues or resource synchronization), time representation and scheduling, experiment conduction and reporting. Supported by this simulation infrastructure, the user is free to concentrate on specifying the model's behaviour in terms of events or processes.

Development

  
  
  

DESMO-J has been developed at University of Hamburg's research group of Modelling and Simulation. First released in 1999, the environment continues to be maintained and kept up to date, now in terms of a SourceForge Project. DESMO-J's predecessor was DESMO, a Modula-2-based simulation library, which in turn was inspired by DEMOS, a system for discrete event modelling on Simula.
A companion book has appeared 2005.

Features 

Besides providing a hybrid discrete event simulation environment able to process event as well as process model descriptions, key features of DESMO-J include:

 A GUI for experiment conduction
 2D animation, based on icons and symbols
 3D visualization, based on Java3d

Furthermore, an online tutorial is available on the project web page.

Most real-world DESMO-J applications focus on manufacturing and logistics. DESMO-J is integrated into business process modelling tools like Borland Together or Intellivate IYOPRO, augmenting these tools with simulation functionality.

See also
Discrete event simulation
List of discrete event simulation software

References

External links

Free simulation software
Scientific simulation software
Java (programming language) libraries
Software using the Apache license